Caselle Torinese is a comune (municipality) in the Metropolitan City of Turin in the Italian region Piedmont, located about  northwest of Turin, on the left bank of the Stura di Lanzo.

See also
Turin Airport

References

External links
 Official website

Cities and towns in Piedmont